Tupi Football Club, commonly referred to as Tupi, is a Brazilian professional club based in Juiz de Fora, Minas Gerais founded on 26 May 1912. It competes in the Campeonato Mineiro Módulo II, the second tier of the Minas Gerais state football league.

History
On May 16, 1912, Antônio Maria Júnior, João Baptista Georg and four other people founded Tupi Football Club.

In 2001, Tupi won its first title, which was the Campeonato Mineiro Módulo II, finishing ahead of Nacional de Uberaba in the final stage, which was a group stage competed by six clubs. In 2008, Tupi won the Taça Minas Gerais. In the final, they beat América Futebol Clube (MG) (América Mineiro) in a 4−3 aggregate result.

They won the Série D in 2011, after they beat Santa Cruz in the final.

In 2015 the club finished 3rd in the Campeonato Brasileiro - Série C (third tier), qualifying for the Campeonato Brasileiro - Série B (second tier) in 2016.

Stadium

Tupi's stadium is Estádio Municipal Radialista Mário Helênio, inaugurated in 1988, with a maximum capacity of 35,000 people.

Honours
 Campeonato Brasileiro Série D
 Winners (1): 2011

 Campeonato Mineiro do Interior
 Winners (6): 1985, 1987, 2003, 2008, 2012, 2018

 Campeonato Mineiro Módulo II
 Winners (2): 1983, 2001

 Taça Minas Gerais
 Winners (1): 2008

References

External links
 Official Site
 Tupi on Globo Esporte

Tupi Football Club
Association football clubs established in 1912
Football clubs in Minas Gerais
Football clubs in Brazil
Juiz de Fora
1912 establishments in Brazil
Campeonato Brasileiro Série D winners